The American Refrigerator Transit Company (ART) was a St. Louis, Missouri-based private refrigerator car line established in 1881 by the Missouri Pacific and Wabash railroads. It is now a subsidiary of the Union Pacific Corporation.

American Refrigerator Transit Company, 1900–1970:

*estimated.

Source: The Great Yellow Fleet, p. 16.

References

 Green, Gene (2005) "Refrigerator Car Color Guide", Morning Sun Books, Scotch Plains, NJ.  .
 White, John W.  (1986).  The Great Yellow Fleet.  Golden West Books, San Marino, CA.  .
 

American companies established in 1881
Refrigerator car lines of the United States
Union Pacific Railroad
1881 establishments in Missouri